The Snia Viscosa Tower is a skyscraper in Milan, Italy.

History 
The building, commissioned by the Italian chemical company Snia Viscosa, was designed by Italian architect Alessandro Rimini. Construction works began in 1935 and were completed in 1937. The building followed the new planning regulations for the city of Milan introduced by Cesare Albertini that sought to transform and renew the area around Piazza San Babila. The tower was the first skyscraper in Milan and its tallest for 14 years.

Description 

References

External links

Snia Viscosa Tower on Lombardia Beni Culturali—
Snia Viscosa Tower on Catalogo generale dei Beni Culturali—

Skyscrapers in Milan